Nazism in Chile has a long history dating back to the 1930s.

National politics
After the dissolution of the National Socialist Movement of Chile (MNSCH) in 1938, notable former members of MNSCH migrated into Partido Agrario Laborista (PAL), obtaining high charges. Not all former MNSCH members joined the PAL; some continued to form parties of the MNSCH line until 1952. A new old-school Nazi party was formed in 1964 by school teacher Franz Pfeiffer. Among the activities of this group were the organization of a Miss Nazi beauty contest and the formation of a Chilean branch of the Ku Klux Klan. The party disbanded in 1970. Pfeiffer attempted to restart it in 1983 in the wake of a wave of protest against the military dictatorship of Augusto Pinochet.

Historically Nazism had also detractors in Chile. Example of this is the telegram sent by Salvador Allende and other members of the Congress of Chile to Adolf Hitler after the Kristallnacht (1938) in which they denounced the persecution of Jews.

German Chilean community
Even before the Nazi takeover of Germany in 1933 there was a German Chilean youth organization with strong Nazi influence. Nazi Germany pursued a policy of Nazification of the German Chilean community. These communities and their organizations were considered a cornerstone to extend the Nazi ideology across the world by Nazi Germany. It is widely known that, though there were discrepancies, most German Chileans were passive supporters of Nazi Germany. Nazism was widespread among the German Lutheran Church hierarchy in Chile. A local chapter of the Nazi Party was started in Chile.

While Nazi Germany did pursue a policy of nazification of overseas German communities the German community in Chile did not act as an extension of the German state to any significant degree.

Racial ideologies
Nicolás Palacios considered the "Chilean race" to be a mix of two bellicose master races: the Visigoths of Spain and the Mapuche (Araucanians) of Chile.  Palacios traces the origins of the Spanish component of the "Chilean race" to the coast of the Baltic Sea, specifically to Götaland in Sweden, one of the supposed homelands of the Goths. Palacios claimed that both the blonde-haired and the bronze-coloured Chilean Mestizo share a "moral physonomy" and a masculine psychology. He opposed immigration from Southern Europe, and argued that Mestizos who are derived from south Europeans lack "cerebral control" and are a social load.

See also 
 Antisemitism in Chile
 Colonia Dignidad
 German influence in Chile
 Miguel Serrano
 Nazism in the Americas
 Pinochetism
 Seguro Obrero massacre

References

Bibliography

 Identidad, ideología y política en el Movimiento Nacional Socialista de Chile, 1932-1938*
  El nacionalismo chileno entre el fascismo y el autoritarismo conservador
 Documentos sobre actividades nazi en Chile (1937 y 1944)

Antisemitism in Chile
Far-right politics in Chile
Fascism in Chile
German-Chilean culture
Racism in Chile
Abandoned projects of Nazi Germany